Histagonia is a monotypic genus of South African comb-footed spiders containing the single species, Histagonia deserticola. It was first described by Eugène Louis Simon in 1895, and is found in South Africa.

See also
 List of Theridiidae species

References

Endemic fauna of South Africa
Monotypic Araneomorphae genera
Spiders of South Africa
Theridiidae